= Robert Walker-Brown =

British Army Officer

Lieutenant Colonel Robert Walker-Brown, MBE, DSO (b. 9 April 1919, Sutton Coldfield, Warwickshire; d. 16 August 2009) was a British Army officer who served in the Special Air Service during World War II and afterwards. He escaped from an Italian prisoner of war camp in October 1943 and returned to the United Kingdom. Walker-Brown served in the Army until 1963 and had a short period in the Ministry of Defence.
